Frank Edward Liebel (November 19, 1919December 26, 1996) was a professional American football end/defensive back in the National Football League. He is also a member of the Pennsylvania Sports Hall of Fame.

Early life and education
Frank was born on November 19, 1919 in Erie, Pennsylvania to Frank J. Liebel (1896-1957) and Clara Rafferty (1900-1967). His grandfather, Edward Constantine Liebel (1875-1969) was born in Leimersheim, Germany, and was the nephew of Reinhard Liebel (1841-1905), himself the uncle of Michael Liebel, Jr. (1870–1927) (Mayor of Erie, Pennsylvania, from 1906-1911, and a Democratic member of the United States House of Representatives from Pennsylvania, from 1915-1917), all of Erie, Pennsylvania. Together Frank and Clara had four children:
William Liebel (1915-1972)
Frank Edward Liebel (1919-1996)
Robert Martin Liebel (1922-1999)
Betty Liebel (1924-2001)

He attended Erie Academy for high school and Norwich University for college, graduating in 1943.

Career
Liebel his NFL career began with the New York Giants, signing with them as a free agent in 1942, a year before he graduated from Norwich.

He played seven seasons for the New York Giants (1942–1947) and the Chicago Bears (1948).  He led the league in 1945 in yard per reception (27.0) and receiving touchdowns (10) for his 22 receptions.  He also was Named to the All-NFL 2nd Team in both 1945 and 1946.

During the 1944 NFL Championship Game, Liebel was on the Giants’ sideline when they lost to Green Bay, and again in 1948, this time with the Chicago Cardinals, for the 1948 NFL Championship Game with the Cardinals when they fell to Philadelphia in the final.

Liebel also was a reserve for the 1948 Chicago Cardinals, but didn’t record any statistics for them. His final career NFL numbers were 84 receptions for 1,753 yards and 23 TDs on offense, plus seven interceptions and three fumble recoveries on defense.

1946 NFL Championship Game
The day before the 1946 NFL Championship Game between the New York Giants and the Chicago Bears, two players for the Giants, Frank Filchock and Merle Hapes, had been accused of taking bribes to fix the game from Alvin Paris. New York City Mayor William O'Dwyer had Jack Mara, Wellington Mara and Bert Bell informed of the police evidence against the two.

Within hours, the four then met at Gracie Mansion and the mayor interviewed the players one at a time. Under questioning, Hapes admitted that he was offered a bribe and Filchock denied being offered it. Several hours later, Paris was arrested and confessed to bribing the players. Hapes was suspended by Bell, but Filchock was allowed to play.

During the game, Liebel caught a 38-yard scoring pass from quarterback Frank Filchock, which New York eventually lost 24-14 to the Chicago Bears.  During Paris' trial weeks later, Filchock admitting taking the bribe under oath.

Honors
Liebel was inducted into the Norwich University Sports Hall of Fame Class of 2008, and the Pennsylvania Sports Hall of Fame.

Post-football career
After retiring from the National Football League, he worked for 29 years with Erie County’s probation and parole department.

Personal life
In 1946, Frank married Arline M. Gorenflo (1923-2011), who was born in Cleveland, Ohio and was the daughter of the Bert and Esther Johnson Gorenflo.  Together Frank and Arline had three children:
Gary Liebel
Gayle Liebel
Tina Liebel

They are buried together at Laurel Hill Cemetery in Millcreek Township, Erie County, Pennsylvania.

References

External links

1919 births
1996 deaths
Sportspeople from Erie, Pennsylvania
Players of American football from Pennsylvania
American football wide receivers
American football defensive backs
Norwich Cadets football players
New York Giants players
Chicago Bears players
Liebel family